Luchazi (Lucazi, Chiluchazi) is a Bantu language of Angola and Zambia. Luchazi is the principal language of the Ngangela Group. Ngangela is a term coined by the Vimbundu traders and missionaries in 18th century to describe the tribes occupying the area of eastern-central Angola.

Phonology

Consonants
The following table displays all the consonants in Luchazi:

 Occur rarely, may only exist in loanwords.

The position of the speech-organs in producing the consonants is different from the positions taken in producing the similar sounds in European languages. T and D, for example, are lower than in English but higher than in Portuguese. L is flatter-tongued than in either English or Portuguese. The language contains many consonantal glides, including the prenasalized plosives and the voiceless alveolar sibilant affricate (the ts sound).

Vowels  

The close front vowel (i), when occurring before another vowel, becomes a semi-consonant and is written y, unless it is immediately preceded by a consonant, when it remains i. Examples: yange, viange.

The vowels have the Continental or Italian values. They are shorter when unstressed and are prolonged when doubled or when stressed at the end of a word.

 The vowel a is Long when accented, as a in tata, nana.
Short when unstressed or before two consonants or y or s and in monosyllabic adverbs, as a in tata, paya, asa, hanga. Prolonged when doubled or stressed at the end of a word or syllable. Example: ku laako.

 The vowel e is Long when accented, as a in heta, seza.
Short when unstressed, as a in hete, seze.
Short with the value of e in henga, lenda before two consonants. Exceptions are hembo and membo (due to coalescence of vowels). Many words derived from Portuguese have the short vowel though not followed by two consonants. Examples: pena, papelo, luneta, ngehena, etc. Prolonged when stressed at the end of a word.

 The vowel i is Long when accented, as e in tina, sika.
Short when unstressed or before two consonants, as e in citi, linga. In monosyllabics it is short, as i in it. Examples: ni, ndi. Prolonged when stressed. Examples: ti, fui.

 The vowel o is Long when accented, as o in sota, koka.
Short when unstressed, as o in soko, loto.
Short, with value of o in onga, yoya, kosa, luozi, ndo, before two consonants or y or s, and sometimes before z and in some monosyllables. The o is long in zoza and ngozi. Sometimes prolonged when stressed at the end of a word. Example: to.

 The vowel u is Long when accented, as u in tuta, fula.
Short, when unstressed or before two consonants or before s, as u in futuka, mbunga, kusa.

Orthography 
Luchazi is written using the Latin alphabet, with most characters representing the same sound as in English, with some exceptions. c is pronounced like ch in church, n followed by k or g is always nasal like ng in ring, the sound of v is bilabial instead of labiodental.

Alphabet
 A - [a/aː]
 B - [β]
 C/Ch - [t͡ʃ/t͡ʃʰ]
 D - [d/d̪/ð]
 E - [ɛ/e/ɛː]
 F - [f]
 G - [g]
 H - [h/x]
 I - [i/iː]
 J - [d͡ʒ]
 K - [k]
 L - [l/ɭ]
 M - [m]
 N - [n]
 Ny - [ɲ]
 O - [ɔ/ɔː]
 P - [p]
 R - [ɹ]
 S - [s]
 Sh - [ʃ]
 T - [t/t̪/θ], [tʲ~t͡s] before [i]
 U - [u/uː]
 W - [w]
 Y - [j]
 Z - [z]

D, G, J, R, and Sh only exist in loanwords.

Other letters
 ai - [aɪ̯]
 au - [aʊ̯]
 ei - [eɪ̯]
 ia - [i̯a]
 ie - [i̯e]
 io - [i̯o]
 iu - [i̯u]
 kh - [kʰ]
 mb - [mb]
 mph - [mpʰ]
 nch - [ɲt͡ʃʰ]
 nd - [ⁿd]
 ng - [ŋg/ŋ]
 nj - [ɲd͡ʒ]
 nk - [ŋkʰ]
 nt - [ⁿtʰ]
 ph - [pʰ]
 th - [tʰ]
 ua - [u̯a]
 ue - [u̯e]
 ui - [u̯i]
 uo - [u̯o]

References

Chokwe-Luchazi languages
Languages of Angola